Gradac is a village in the municipality of Ljubinje, Republika Srpska, Bosnia and Herzegovina. The archaeological site of Pardua is located in the village.

References

Populated places in Ljubinje
Villages in Republika Srpska